Meloë may refer to:
Meloë (Isauria)
Meloë (Lycia)

See also
Meloe, genus of beetles